is a Japanese manga series authored by Hiroyuki Yoshino featuring art by Kenetsu Satō. The series is notable for its violence, fan service, and the use of vital energy coming from women's breasts (referred to as Soma) as a central plot device. The manga series was published in Japan in the manga magazine Champion Red from 2006 to 2016, and the chapters collected into 24 tankōbon volumes. A 24-episode anime television series was produced with the same title as the manga series and broadcast in Japan on Biglobe in 2010. An OVA adaptation titled  was also produced and released on DVD with the manga series volume 10. A 12-episode second season was produced with the title  and was broadcast in Japan between April and June, 2011.

Sentai Filmworks licensed both seasons and the OVA for digital distribution and home video release in North America, releasing English subtitled DVD sets in 2012 and 2013.

Plot

The story chronicles the school lives of Mafuyu Oribe and Tomo Yamanobe at the Japanese Eastern Orthodox school St. Mihailov Academy, where they have endured persecution and isolation from other students led by the daughter of the current dean Miyuri Tsujidou and her second-in-command Hana Katsuragi. Mafuyu and Tomo's lives take a drastic turn when they nurse the silver-haired Russian-born Alexander "Sasha" Nikolaevich Hell back to health upon encountering him unconscious one day during their home commute. Almost immediately, Sasha begins to repay Mafuyu and Tomo's kindness as he repels their tormentors; however, this does not change Sasha's background as a throw-away Qwaser from the Adepts, and that the Adepts have no qualms about making an absolute war zone of the Academy in order to acquire the Theotokos of Tsarytsin from Athos, who wishes to keep the icon's existence a secret from the world.

Media

Manga

The manga is written by Hiroyuki Yoshino and illustrated by Kenetsu Satō. The Qwaser of Stigmata was serialized by Akita Shoten in Champion Red magazine and the chapters collected in tankōbon. The first volume was released on December 20, 2006. The series ended on July 9, 2016, and was collected into 24 volumes.

The manga series has been licensed internationally, translated, and published in several countries outside Japan. The series is licensed in France by Kazé, listing the first 14 volumes in their online catalog. In Italy the manga series is licensed by J-Pop Edizioni. and Ever Glory Publishing in Taiwan. Tokyopop licensed the series for the North American market and published the first four volumes; however, since resuming business in December 2012, the title has not been listed in their online catalog.

Anime

A 24-episode anime television series titled  was adapted from the manga series of the same name and broadcast as a censored version on Biglobe. An uncensored version of the series was streamed online. The first season was followed by a single episode OVA with the title  that was released on DVD with the manga series volume 10. A 12-episode second season titled  was broadcast in Japan in 2011 . The first and second seasons were also released on DVD in Japan.

Sentai Filmworks licensed both seasons and the OVA in North America and released three English subtitled DVD sets between 2012 and 2013.
 The Qwaser of Stigmata - Collection 1, 3 DVDs, episodes 1-12, released: 2012-12-31.
 The Qwaser of Stigmata - Collection 2, 3 DVDs, episodes 13-24, released: 2013-02-26.
 The Qwaser of Stigmata II - Complete Collection, 3 DVDs, episodes 1-12 plus the OVA, released: 2013-04-30.

Anime Network posted the Season I and II episodes for online streaming (uncensored).

Internet radio show
Lantis has taken the opportunity presented by the Seikon no Qwaser anime to produce an Internet radio show starring 
Aki Toyosaki as Tomo Yamanobe and Yōko Hikasa as Hana Katsuragi  alongside commercially releasing the five theme songs as indicated in the table below. They released also an original soundtrack composed by Tatsuya Kato on June 7, 2010.

Reception
Reviewer Chris Beveridge gives the series' grades in the "B" range in The Fandom Post. Theron Martin, an anime reviewer for the Anime News Network, reviewed the DVD release collections 1 and 2 of the first season gives the series grades from C+ (story) to A− (music).

References

External links
 Official website of the anime 
 

2006 manga
2010 anime OVAs
2010 anime television series debuts
2011 anime television series debuts
Akita Shoten manga
Adventure anime and manga
Bandai Namco franchises
Hoods Entertainment
Japanese LGBT-related animated television series
Romance anime and manga
Sentai Filmworks
Seinen manga
Supernatural anime and manga
Television shows written by Makoto Uezu
Tokyo MX original programming